Dr. Seuss' The Grinch: Original Motion Picture Soundtrack and Dr. Seuss' The Grinch: Original Motion Picture Score are the albums released for the 2018 computer-animated Christmas fantasy comedy film The Grinch, released alongside the film, on November 9, 2018, by Columbia Records and Back Lot Music. The film score is composed by Danny Elfman, which consisted of 25 tracks. The soundtrack album consisted of 13 tracks, performed by several artists, including a re-created version of the Christmas song "You're a Mean One, Mr. Grinch" by Elfman and rapper Tyler, the Creator, released on October 24. Tyler also produced his debut extended play based on songs from the film, titled Music Inspired by Illumination & Dr. Seuss' The Grinch, and released by Columbia Records on November 16.

Dr. Seuss' The Grinch: Original Motion Picture Soundtrack 

The lead single from the film "You're a Mean One, Mr. Grinch" was performed by Tyler, the Creator, and composed by Tyler and Elfman, which featured in the first trailer of the film. The animated lyric video for the film was also released on the same date. The song featured rap portions as well as children's choir, which was suggested by Tyler.

Elfman revealed that recreating "You’re a Mean One, Mr. Grinch" is a "slightly more complex task" on his collaboration with Tyler, and called it as "a definite bold move". Tyler gave his ideas to Elfman and they tried to find the "perfect balance between preserving recognizable elements of the song and leaning into a more contemporary take". He recalls that "some of the suggestions for tweaks were chord adjustments to bring more of the original sound of the track back into the piece". Speaking to Entertainment Weekly, Elfman said "I just didn’t want to destroy the essence of his take because artistically I never want to be the one to whitewash an artist's work that I respect. It was a bit of a tightrope act between what I know what the studio would like, and I didn't want to push him into an area he was uncomfortable".

The second track, an original song, "I Am the Grinch", was released on November 9, 2018 along with the film's soundtrack by Columbia Records. Tyler also produced and performed the song. The soundtrack was additionally released in vinyl on December 21, with two additional pressings were released on December 25, 2020 and November 5, 2021.

Track listing

Chart performance

Dr. Seuss' The Grinch: Original Motion Picture Score 

Danny Elfman composed the film's score. Elfman revealed that the animated project was a "full-circle moment for him in many ways" due to his own childhood connection to Seuss stories. As the film's release, eventually coincided with the 25th anniversary of Tim Burton's The Nightmare Before Christmas, which Elfman had scored several songs, he revealed to Entertainment Weekly, saying that all songs from the film are inspired by Dr. Seuss metering and rhythm in the lyrics, adding that "the musicality, the metric quality, it all goes back to Dr. Seuss". He also met Seuss for the potential musical based on Oh, the Places You'll Go!, which did not materialise. Elfman agreed to score for The Grinch, due to Illumination's dedication to Seuss' original story: "I knew the film was going to be Dr. Seuss, that they weren’t going to transform it that much. Obviously, they were going to have to change it into a feature-length film and add a lot, but I felt like they were still going to be respectful to the Seuss spirit".

The score album was released by Back Lot Music on November 9.

Reception 
The score received positive reviews. Jonathan Broxton wrote: "The main theme – once you find it – is good, the orchestrations and arrangements are rich and varied, the action music is at times wonderfully boisterous if a little scattershot, the emotional content often allows the score to reach some lovely heights, and it features many of Elfman’s most beloved compositional idiosyncrasies and instrumental combinations, some of which date all the way back to his 1990s heyday. But there's just something – something – about it which doesn't connect with me on a base level". Filmtracks.com wrote that "Dr. Seuss' The Grinch is a respectful and effective score, but it's Elfman clearly on auto-pilot, and don't be surprised if the score-only album provides you nothing more than a short-lived mood perk".

Track listing 

 For Your Consideration track list

Notes

References 

2018 soundtrack albums
2018 compilation albums
2018 EPs
Columbia Records soundtracks
Columbia Records EPs
Back Lot Music soundtracks
Tyler, the Creator albums
Albums produced by Tyler, the Creator
Various artists albums
Danny Elfman soundtracks
Hip hop soundtracks
Rock soundtracks
Film scores
2018 Christmas albums
Christmas EPs
Columbia Records Christmas albums
The Grinch (franchise)